The 2010–11 Arkansas–Little Rock Trojans men's basketball team represented the University of Arkansas at Little Rock during the 2010–11 NCAA Division I men's basketball season. The Trojans, led by 8th year head coach Steve Shields, played their home games at the Jack Stephens Center and are members of the Sun Belt Conference. They finished the season with a record of 19–17, 7–9 in Sun Belt play. They won the 2011 Sun Belt Conference men's basketball tournament to earn an automatic bid in the 2011 NCAA Division I men's basketball tournament. They lost in the new First Four round to UNC Asheville in overtime.

Roster

Schedule
 
|-
!colspan=9 style=| Regular season

|-
!colspan=9 style=| Sun Belt tournament

|-
!colspan=9 style=| NCAA tournament

References

Arkansas-Little Rock
Arkansas-Little Rock
Arkansas-Little Rock Trojans men's basketball team
Arkansas-Little Rock Trojans men's basketball team
Little Rock Trojans men's basketball seasons